Turkmen State University named for Magtymguly is one of the leading universities in Turkmenistan, located in the capital city Ashgabat. It is named after Magtymguly Pyragy, a Turkmen poet. Its current rector is Baýramgül Motyýewna Orazdurdyýewa.

History 

Turkmen State University named after Maxim Gorky was founded on July 14, 1950, through the reorganization of the Ashkhabad Pedagogical Institute, which had existed since 1931. It has been a member of the Eurasian Association of Universities since 1989. It was renamed in honor of the Turkmen poet Magtymguly Pyragy in 1993.

Faculties 
Mathematics and Mechanics
Physics and Astronomy
Informatics and Computer Engineering
Biological Sciences
Chemistry
Earth Sciences
Psychological Sciences
Linguistics and Study of Literature (specialties: Turkmen Language and Literature; English Language and Literature; German Language and Literature; French Language and Literature; Italian Language and Literature; Arabic Language and Literature; Turkish Language and Literature; Persian Language and Literature; Chinese Language and Literature, Russian Language and Literature).
Mass Media and Information-Library Science
History and Archeology
Philosophy and Ethics
Theology
Political Sciences and Regional Studies
Jurisprudence

Campus 

In 2007, the French company Bouygues built the main building of TSU with a library, a reading room, an assembly hall and a total area of 13,500 m2 at a cost of $40 million.

Bouygues under contract with TSU executed reconstruction of buildings for $45 million. The firm also reconstructed of the façade of the main building as well as one other.

On September 1, 2008, the physics and mathematics faculty was opened. President of Turkmenistan Gurbanguly Berdimuhamedov attended the dedication of the building. On September 1, 2011, the faculty of geography and two blocks of dormitories built by Bouygues were opened. The geography building can accommodate 800 students.

Famous alumni
During World War II, part of Moscow State University was evacuated to Ashgabat (then known as Ashkhabad), where it operated out of the Ashkhabad Pedagogical Institute. Many classes were taught jointly by the two institutions.  Among the Moscow State University graduates in 1942 was the famous Soviet physicist and human-rights defender Andrei Sakharov, who completed his degree program in Ashkhabad.

References

External links
Official site

 
Universities in Turkmenistan
Buildings and structures in Ashgabat
Educational institutions established in 1950
Buildings and structures built in the Soviet Union
Education in the Soviet Union
Education in Turkmenistan
Educational organizations based in Turkmenistan
Education in Ashgabat
1950 establishments in the Soviet Union